This is the list of the brood parasites in order Passeriformes, the perching birds. Instead of making nests of their own, and feeding their young, brood parasites deposit their eggs in the nests of other birds.

Note that the vampire finch is a parasite, but is not brood parasitic.

Species

 Family Viduidae
 Genus Anomalospiza
 Cuckoo-finch Anomalospiza imberbis
 Genus Vidua
 Village indigobird, Vidua chalybeata
 Jambandu indigobird, Vidua raricola
 Barka indigobird, Vidua larvaticola
 Jos Plateau indigobird, Vidua maryae
 Quailfinch indigobird, Vidua nigeriae
 Dusky indigobird or variable indigobird, Vidua funerea
 Zambezi indigobird or green indigobird, Vidua codringtoni
 Purple indigobird or dusky indigobird, Vidua purpurascens
 Wilson's indigobird or pale-winged indigobird, Vidua wilsoni
 Cameroon indigobird, Vidua camerunensis
 Steel-blue whydah, Vidua hypocherina
 Straw-tailed whydah, Vidua fischeri
 Shaft-tailed whydah, Vidua regia
 Pin-tailed whydah, Vidua macroura
 Togo paradise whydah, Vidua togoensis
 Exclamatory paradise whydah or long-tailed paradise whydah, Vidua interjecta
 Long-tailed paradise whydah or eastern paradise whydah, Vidua paradisaea
 Sahel paradise whydah or northern paradise whydah, Vidua orientalis
 Broad-tailed paradise whydah, Vidua obtusa
Family Icteridae
 Genus Molothrus
 Shiny cowbird Molothrus bonariensis
 Brown-headed cowbird Molothrus ater
 Screaming cowbird Molothrus rufoaxillaris
 Giant cowbird Molothrus oryzivorus
 Bronzed cowbird Molothrus aeneus

References

Brood parasites